Alan Morris may refer to:
Alan Morris (cricketer) (born 1953), English cricketer
Alan Morris (footballer) (1954–1998), English footballer
Alan Morris (advertiser) (1942–2007), Australian advertising creative executive
Alan Morris (character), fictional character in The Saga of Darren Shan

See also
Allan Morris (disambiguation)
Allen Morris (disambiguation)